Dynamic Diagrams is an information design consultancy based in Providence, Rhode Island, United States. Its services include information architecture and design for web sites and applications, as well as diagramming complex processes, systems, and data to help clients explain and sell their ideas. The company provides visual design capabilities supported by research and analysis to understand user and business needs.

Dynamic Diagrams was founded in 1990 by Paul Kahn and Krzysztof Lenk, who first worked together to design the hypertext system Intermedia (hypertext) at Brown University’s Institute for Research in Information and Scholarship (IRIS). The company retains strong ties to Brown and the Rhode Island School of Design (RISD), where Krzysztof Lenk is a member of the graphic design faculty. Dynamic Diagrams has been affiliated with Cadmus Communications Corporation, Inc. and Ingenta, but has operated as an independent studio under the leadership of Tim Roy since 2002.

Dynamic Diagrams is known for using isometric projections or Z-diagrams to map web sites (Dodge, 1999; Kahn & Lenk, 2001; Kahn, Lenk, & Kaczmarek, 2001), for developing the software program MAPA (Durand & Kahn, 1998), and for publishing the Information Design Watch blog. The company's work appears in several books on information architecture and information design (see Further Reading).

See also
 Information architecture
 Information design
 Visual design
 Visualization (graphic)

References

Further reading 
 

 

 

  The book provides an overview of the Dynamic Diagrams process of visualizing and planning complex web site structure, notably use of the isometric or “Z-diagram” approach to creating site planning maps.

  A survey of methods for mapping cyberspace, including examples from Dynamic Diagrams.

 

  Dynamic Diagrams' work appears in Business and Trade.

  Dynamic Diagrams' work appears in this book.

External links
 

Privately held companies based in Rhode Island
Consulting firms established in 1990
Graphic design studios
Information architects
1990 establishments in Rhode Island